Protogastraceae is a family of fungi in the order Boletales that contains the single genus Protogaster. The genus in turn contains the single species Protogaster rhizophilus, found on the roots of Viola in the USA. The family was described by American mycologist Sanford Myron Zeller in 1934, the genus and species by Roland Thaxter.

References

Boletales
Fungi of North America
Monotypic Boletales genera